This is a list of number one Pop singles on the Billboard Brasil Hot Pop chart in 2009. Note that Billboard publishes a monthly chart. The first number-one single on the chart was "Halo" by Beyoncé.

Chart history

See also
Billboard Brasil
List of Hot 100 number-one singles of 2009 (Brazil)

References 

Brazil pop
2009 in Brazil
2009 pop